The Climb is a 2017 French adventure comedy film directed by Ludovic Bernard which tells the real-life story of Nadir Dendoune.

Plot
Samy Diakhaté is a young man of Senegalese origin from the Cité des 4000 in La Courneuve. Like many of his friends, he is unemployed but wants to get out of it. Since middle school, he has been in love with Nadia, an employee of the neighborhood supermarket. He try to win her with his kindness, but she resists him, for fear of loving a frivolous boy who will disappoint her. Samy tells her that out of love for her, he would climb Mount Everest, but Nadia takes this for a joke. Samy, determined to impress Nadia, starts looking for funding for his trip to Nepal. Without having experience of mountaineering or even physical training, he throws himself into the adventure but quickly realizes his weaknesses and the colossal challenge he must face. Meanwhile, the news has spread through the suburbs and Paris like wildfire: the whole suburb, radio and press, is with Samy to cheer him on and watch his exploits hour by hour, while his mother is dying of anguish at losing her son.

Cast

 Ahmed Sylla as Samy Diakhate
 Alice Belaïdi as Nadia
  as Ben
  as Jeff
  as Max
 Maïmouna Gueye as Madame Diakhate
  as M. Diakhate
  as Houria
 Moussa Maaskri as Nassir
 Umesh Tamang as Johnny
 Shriprem Gurung as Dorge
  as Kevin
 Jochen Hägele as Emmerich
 Julian Bugier as himself

Production
The movie was first introduced during the Festival du Film de Comédie de L'Alpe d'Huez.

See also
List of media related to Mount Everest

References

External links
 

2017 films
2010s adventure comedy films
French adventure comedy films
2010s French-language films
Films about Mount Everest
Mountaineering films
2017 comedy films
Films directed by Ludovic Bernard
Films shot in Kathmandu
2010s French films